The Dr. Moises Frumencio da Costa Gomez University of Curaçao, formerly University of The Netherlands Antilles (UNA), is the state university of Curaçao. It is a public university, graduating approximately three hundred students per year. The quality and level of the program are similar to those in the Netherlands. All programs provided at the university are accredited by The Nederlands-Vlaamse Accreditatieorganisatie (NVAO).

History
The University of Curaçao has existed in its present form since 1973. Its history, however, dates back to 1970, the year in which the Law College of the Netherlands Antilles was established by a national decree dated October 6, 1970 (O.B. 1970 no. 1130), to prepare students to take the LL.B. Antillean Law exam. The Law College became the College of the Netherlands Antilles in 1974, after a degree program in Business Administration was established. The Department of Business Administration was changed into the Department of Business Administration and Public Administration in 1977, after which students could also obtain a bachelor's degree in Public Administration. Finally, with the foundation of the UNA in 1979 by a national decree dated 12 January 1979 (O.B. 1979 no. 12), the Antillean College of Technology (established 1972), was transformed into the Faculty of Engineering.

In 2011 the University of the Netherlands Antilles was renamed the University of Curaçao mr. dr. Moises Frumencio da Costa Gomez.

Faculties and programs 

The Faculty of Law
Bachelor (LL.B.) in Curaçao Law
Master (LL.M.) degrees in Curaçao law

The Faculty of Engineering
Bachelor (B.Sc.) Civil Engineering
Bachelor (B.Sc.) Architecture 
Bachelor (B.Sc.) Electrical System Engineering 
Bachelor (B.Sc.) Industrial Technology
Bachelor (B.Sc.) Information & Communication Technology
Master (MBA) Technology Management

The Faculty of Social Sciences and Economics
Bachelor (B.A.Sc.) degree programs Business Administration (4 majors); Financial Management, Marketing Management, International Business and Management studies, Business Information Systems.
Bachelor (B.A.Sc.) Human Resources Management
Bachelor (B.A.Sc.) Finance & Accounting 
Bachelor (B.A.Sc.) Fiscal Law & Economics
Bachelor (B.Sc.) Accountancy & Control 
Bachelor (B.Sc.) Business & Economics 
Master (M.A.Sc.) Fiscal Law & Economics
Master (M.Sc.) in Accountancy & Management
Master (M.Sc.) in Business Management in Cooperation with Hofstra University, New York.
Executive Financial Management Master program (XFM) in Cooperation with the Rotterdam School of Management at the Erasmus University Rotterdam.

The Faculty of Arts
Educational Bachelor (B.A.) 
Master (M.A.) degree programs in Papiamento, Dutch, Spanish and English, and Elementary teaching science (LOFO).

The Faculty of Societal and Behavioral Studies
Bachelor (B.A.Sc.) Social Work
Master's degree in Social Work

Since 2010, the university has been the seat of the UNESCO Caribbean Small Island Developing State Good Governance Chair.

The university is currently entrusted with oversight of the nation's ".cw" Internet country code top-level domain (ccTLD).

Notable alumni

Mike Eman (Prime Minister of Aruba)
Diana Lebacs writer and knight in the Order of Orange-Nassau
René Römer (CEO Curaçao International Financial Center and Dutch Caribbean Securities Exchange N.V.)

Notable faculty

Full professors

Ronald E. Severing (Director of the Foundation for Language Planning)
Johannes I.M. (Joop) Halman
Frank Kunneman (vice president of the Government Advice Council)
Wim Rutgers

Former faculty
Frank Martinus Arion
Rutsel Martha (Former Minister of Justice and diplomat)

References

External links 

Official site of the SIDS GG Chair

Universities in Curaçao
Educational institutions established in 1979
1979 establishments in Curaçao